In enzymology, a tRNA (guanine-N1-)-methyltransferase is an enzyme that catalyzes the chemical reaction

S-adenosyl-L-methionine + tRNA  S-adenosyl-L-homocysteine + tRNA containing N1-methylguanine

Thus, the two substrates of this enzyme are S-adenosyl methionine and tRNA, whereas its two products are S-adenosylhomocysteine and tRNA containing N1-methylguanine.

This enzyme belongs to the family of transferases, specifically those transferring one-carbon group methyltransferases.  The systematic name of this enzyme class is S-adenosyl-L-methionine:tRNA (guanine-N1-)-methyltransferase. Other names in common use include transfer ribonucleate guanine 1-methyltransferase, tRNA guanine 1-methyltransferase, and S-adenosyl-L-methionine:tRNA (guanine-1-N-)-methyltransferase.

Structural studies

References

 
 
 
 

EC 2.1.1
Enzymes of known structure